Russell James Kelly (born 10 August 1976) is a Northern Irish former footballer who played as a midfielder. Kelly played for Leyton Orient and Darlington in the English Football League and had later spells with clubs in the Scottish League and in Iceland, before finishing his career with Linfield in the Irish League.

Playing career
Kelly began his career with Chelsea but did not make a first team appearance. He had a two-month loan spell beginning in March 1996 with Third Division club Leyton Orient before joining Darlington in August, then also of the Third Division. He scored two goals in 23 games for the Quakers, scoring in a 1–1 draw with Rochdale and a 5–2 victory over Lincoln City.

He then moved to Scottish football, signing for St Mirren in August 1997. Although he scored in the Scottish League Cup, he left the club in September to join Dundee where he won the Scottish First Division. After a season there, he dropped a division to sign for Ayr United after a short spell in Iceland. He left Ayr for a short spell with Partick Thistle in March 2000.

Kelly joined Linfield in November 2000; the fans funded his signing. He made a great start to his Blues career, scoring in December against arch-rivals Glentoran. He also played for Linfield in UEFA Champions League qualifying against FC Torpedo Kutaisi. Kelly was released by Linfield in May 2003.

Honours
Linfield
Irish League: 2000–01
Irish Cup: 2001–02
Irish League Cup: 2001–02
County Antrim Shield: 2000–01

References

1976 births
Living people
People from Ballymoney
Ayr United F.C. players
Chelsea F.C. players
Darlington F.C. players
Dundee F.C. players
Leyton Orient F.C. players
Linfield F.C. players
Partick Thistle F.C. players
St Mirren F.C. players
Þór Akureyri players
NIFL Premiership players
Scottish Football League players
Republic of Ireland youth international footballers
English Football League players
Association football midfielders
Association footballers from Northern Ireland
Expatriate association footballers from Northern Ireland
Expatriate footballers in England
Expatriate footballers in Scotland
Expatriate footballers in Iceland